Anne Laughlin is a Chicago-based writer from Chicago, Illinois.  She is the author of seven novels of crime fiction, as well as many published short stories.  She was named an emerging writer by the Lambda Literary Foundation in 2008 and 2014 and was awarded a writing residency at Ragdale. Anne has been awarded four Goldie Awards from the Golden Crown Literary Society as well as being short-listed three times for the prestigious Lambda Literary Awards ("The Lammys).

Anne has been published throughout her career by Bold Strokes Books, an independent press that specializes in works by LGBTQ authors. From her first novel, Sometimes Quickly, Anne has centered her stories around the lives of queer characters caught up in someway with crime. She has written a police procedural, three books featuring a private detective, and three mysteries. She also wrote the game Murder at the Folkestone Inn, for the Adventure Game Toolkit, which won an Honorable Mention in a contest sponsored by the platform. Her short stories have appeared in many anthologies of queer literature. It Only Occurred to me Later was a finalist in the short fiction contest of Saints and Sinners Literary Festival

She currently serves as treasurer for the Mystery Writers of America Midwest and is a member of MWA's Queer Advisory Board. She reviews books for The Gay & Lesbian Review and Lambda Literary Review. 

A lifelong Chicagoan, Anne lives on the far north side of Chicago with her wife, Linda Braasch. In her spare time, she teaches adults to read at Literacy Chicago and also volunteers at the LGBTQ Gerber Hart Library and Archives.

Publications 
Sometimes Quickly (2008)

Veritas (2009)

Runaway (2012)

The Acquittal (2014)

A Date to Die (2017)

Money Creek (2020)

References
 

21st-century American novelists
American mystery writers
American women short story writers
American women novelists
American lesbian writers
Living people
Writers from Chicago
American LGBT novelists
Women mystery writers
21st-century American women writers
21st-century American short story writers
Novelists from Illinois
21st-century American LGBT people
1955 births